This is a list of the National Register of Historic Places listings in Hill County, Texas.

This is intended to be a complete list of properties and districts listed on the National Register of Historic Places in Hill County, Texas. There are one district and 22 individual properties listed on the National Register in the county. Eight individually listed properties are Recorded Texas Historic Landmarks including one that is also a State Antiquities Landmark. The district contains several more Recorded Texas Historic Landmarks.

Current listings

The publicly disclosed locations of National Register properties and districts may be seen in a mapping service provided.

|}

See also

National Register of Historic Places listings in Texas
Recorded Texas Historic Landmarks in Hill County

References

External links

Registered Historic Places
Hill County
Buildings and structures in Hill County, Texas